|}

The Summer Handicap Hurdle is a National Hunt hurdle race in Great Britain which is open to horses aged three years or older. It is run at Market Rasen over a distance of about 2 miles and half a furlong (2 miles and 148 yards, or 3,354 metres), and it is scheduled to take place each year in late July.

The race was first run in 1995 as the Summer Festival Handicap Hurdle.  It was awarded Listed status in 2008 but was downgraded as of 2020. The distance of the race was reduced from 2m 1½f to 2m ½f in 2010.

Records
Leading jockey since 1995 (3 wins):
 Denis O'Regan – Australia Day (2010), Viva Colonia (2011), Sea Lord (2013) 

Leading trainer since 1995 (3 wins):
 Martin Pipe – Eden Dancer (1999), Puntal (2002), Buena Vista (2005)

Winners

See also
 Horse racing in Great Britain
 List of British National Hunt races

References
Racing Post: 

National Hunt hurdle races
National Hunt races in Great Britain
Market Rasen Racecourse